The 2016–17 Eerste Divisie, known as Jupiler League for sponsorship reasons, was the sixty-first season of Eerste Divisie since its establishment in 1955. It began in August 2016 with the first matches of the season and ended in May 2017 with the finals of the promotion/relegation play-offs, also involving the 16th- and 17th-placed teams from the 2016–17 Eredivisie. The fixtures were announced on 14 June 2016.

Teams 
A total of 20 teams are taking part in the league. 2015–16 Eerste Divisie champion Sparta Rotterdam gained promotion to the Eredivisie, and was replaced by Cambuur, that finished last in the 2015–16 Eredivisie. Go Ahead Eagles won the post-season playoff, and are replaced in the 2016–17 Eerste Divisie by De Graafschap. Achilles '29 was relegated, and Jong FC Utrecht joined the league.

Personnel and kits

Standings

Period Tables

Period 1

Period 2

Period 3

Period 4

Results

Promotion/relegation play-offs Eredivisie and Eerste Divisie 
The numbers 16 and 17 from the 2016–17 Eredivisie, 4 (substitute) period winners of the 2016–17 Eerste Divisie, as well as the 4 otherwise highest ranked teams of the 2016–17 Eerste Divisie, making a total of 10 teams, decide in a 3-round knockout system which 2 teams will play next season in the 2017–18 Eredivisie. The remaining 8 teams will play next season in the 2017–18 Eerste Divisie. Reserves teams are excluded from participating.

Qualified Teams

Results 

*  Succeeded to remain in the Eredivisie
** Promoted to the Eredivisie

First round

Match A

Match B

Second round

Match C

Match D

Match E

Match F

Final round

Match G

Match H

Number of teams by provinces

Attendances

References

External links 
 

Eerste Divisie seasons
Netherlands 2
2016–17 in Dutch football